A Prime Ministerial Trade Envoy is a position in British foreign policy, within the Department for International Trade since 2016, and formerly with the UK Trade & Investment government department from 2003 to 2016.

Trade Envoys are appointed by the Prime Minister in order to promote British business and trade interests abroad. The Special Representative for International Trade and Investment is a currently dormant position previously held by a member of the British Royal Family, who had the responsibility of representing the Sovereign for trade purposes. Following the 2012 Cabinet reshuffle, Ken Clarke was made a roving trade envoy, focusing on promoting British expertise to emerging economies, in particular China and Brazil.

Between September 2012 and November 2013, Lord Marland served as the Prime Minister's trade envoy. Upon his suggestion, and in collaboration with the Foreign and Commonwealth Office, the post was expanded in November 2012, when David Cameron announced the creation of eight new trade envoys to selected high-growth and developing markets. Additional representatives of the British government were appointed in March 2014 following the success of the initial programme. On 23 August 2021 a further set of envoys were announced, including prominent Brexiteers Lord Botham and Kate Hoey. The appointment of Ian Botham as a Prime Ministerial Trade Envoy was viewed by some people as unexpected, as he has no experience of economic or trade matters. When he was first appointed to the House of Lords, Botham had said that he would join discussions "“when they are debating something I know about – like sport or the countryside", but that there was "[n]ot much point if it’s a trade deal with Japan.”

In April 2017 there were 21 trade envoys, covering approximately 50 markets.

Current Prime Ministerial Trade Envoys

References

Foreign relations of the United Kingdom
Trade in the United Kingdom